The Phillips 66 Company is an American multinational energy company headquartered in Westchase, Houston, Texas. Its name, dating back to 1927 as a trademark of the Phillips Petroleum Company, helped ground the newly reconfigured Phillips 66. The company today was formed ten years after Phillips merged with Conoco to form ConocoPhillips, the merged company spun off its refining, chemical, and retail assets (known as downstream operations in the oil industry) into a new company bearing the Phillips name. It began trading on the New York Stock Exchange on May 1, 2012, under the ticker PSX. 

The company is engaged in refining, transporting, and marketing natural gas liquids (NGL) petrochemicals. They are also active in research and development of emerging energy sources and partners with Chevron on chemicals through a joint venture known as Chevron Phillips Chemical. 

Phillips 66 is ranked No. 29 on the Fortune 500 list and No. 74 on the Fortune Global 500 list as of 2022, with revenues of over $115 billion USD. Phillips 66 has approximately 14,000 employees worldwide and is active in the United States, United Kingdom, Germany, Austria, and Switzerland, and currently owns and licenses out various service station brands across the country, such as 76 and Conoco within the United States, and JET in Europe.

History

Beginning
The Phillips Petroleum Company was founded by Lee Eldas "L.E." Phillips and Frank Phillips of Bartlesville, Oklahoma, and incorporated on June 13, 1917. The new company had assets of $3 million, 27 employees and land throughout Oklahoma and Kansas. After discovery of Texas's huge Panhandle gas field in 1918 and the Hugoton Field to its north in Kansas, Phillips became increasingly involved in the rapidly developing natural gas industry. In particular, the company specialized in extracting liquids from natural gas and by 1925 was the nation's largest producer of natural gas liquids. According to the Phillips Petroleum Company Museum in Bartlesville, the “Phillips 66” name for the gasoline came about by a combination of events. The specific gravity of the gasoline was close to 66; the car testing the fuel did 66 miles per hour; and, the test took place on US Route 66.  So, the naming committee unanimously voted for “Phillips 66.”

The first Phillips 66 service station opened November 19, 1927, at 805 E. Central Street in Wichita, Kansas. This station still stands, preserved by the local historical society. The first Phillips 66 service station built in Texas opened on July 27, 1928, on the corner of 5th and Main streets in Turkey, Texas.

Logo 

The Phillips 66 shield logo, linking it to U.S. Route 66, was introduced in 1930 in a black and orange color scheme that would last nearly thirty years. In 1959, Phillips replaced these colors with red, white and black, the one still deployed. The first design had the second 6 lower than the first; the current design does not. 

From the late 1930s until the 1960s, Phillips employed registered nurses as "highway hostesses" that made random visits to Phillips 66 stations within their districts. The nurses inspected station restroom facilities to ensure they were clean and stocked with supplies. They also served as concierges, spreading goodwill for the company by helping motorists identify suitable dining and lodging facilities. (Union 76 employed similar hostesses, called the "Sparkle Corps".)

Motor oil 
Phillips was among the first oil companies to introduce a multi-grade motor oil, "TropArtic," in 1954. Such motor oils were designed to be used year-round in automobile engines, as opposed to single grades for which different grades of motor oils were recommended to meet weather variances.

Gas stations 
Phillips also had gasoline stations in Canada's western provinces of Alberta, British Columbia, Manitoba, and Saskatchewan under the name Pacific 66 until the late 1970s. In 1932, the 76 brand, long familiar in the western U.S., was created by Union Oil Company of California (later Unocal). In 1946, Phillips purchased the Utah-based Wasatch Oil Co., bringing the Phillips 66 brand to the northern Rocky Mountain states and the far eastern portions of Oregon and Washington.

In 1966, Phillips entered the West Coast market by purchasing Tidewater Oil Co.'s refining and marketing properties in that region and rebranding all Flying A distributorships and service stations to Phillips 66.

In 1967, Phillips became the nation's second oil company, after Texaco, to sell and market gasoline in all 50 states, by opening a Phillips 66 station in Anchorage, Alaska. However, Phillips' experiment in 50-state marketing was short-lived.
The company withdrew from gasoline marketing in the northeastern U.S. in 1972, and sold the former Tidewater properties on the West Coast to The Oil & Shale Corporation (Tosco) in 1976. Today, Phillips 66 primarily operates in the Midwest and Southwest. In recent years, the 76, Phillips 66 and Conoco brand-names have begun to reappear in Eastern markets, including the New York City metro region, via a licensing deal with Motiva Enterprises.

Mergers 
Phillips Petroleum created a joint venture with Chevron Corporation's chemicals and plastics division in 2000 and also acquired ARCO Alaska from BP. It purchased Tosco, which included Circle K convenience stores and Union 76 gasoline, in 2001. The 76 brand, long familiar in the western and southern U.S., was created by Union Oil Company of California (later Unocal) in 1932. In 1983, Phillips Petroleum purchased the General American Oil Company from owners Algur H. Meadows, Henry W. Peters, and Ralph G. Trippett.

In 2002, Phillips Petroleum merged with Conoco to form ConocoPhillips. The merged company continued marketing gasoline and other products under the Phillips 66, Conoco, and 76 brands. However, Phillips 66 Company licenses the Phillips 66 brand to Suncor Energy for its Phillips 66-branded stations in Colorado.

Marketing 

In 1973, Phillips began billing itself as "The Performance Company," promoting innovations with asphaltic materials, fertilizers, and other non-automotive products as well as its traditional automotive products. Other slogans have included: "Go first-class.... Go Phillips 66"; "The gasoline that won the West"; "Good things for cars and the people who drive them"; "Hard working gas"; and "At Phillips 66, it's performance that counts." Their slogan as of July 2015 is "Proud To Be Here". Phillips 66's newest slogan as of 2017 is “Live To The Full”.

Phillips 66 has long been a supporter of basketball in the Midwest and Southwest, particularly at the collegiate and senior amateur level. The men's and women's conference basketball tournaments of the Big Eight Conference, which featured multiple universities in Phillips 66's footprint, was officially sponsored by the firm since the 1980s: the sponsorship would move to its successor, the Big 12 Conference, in 1997 and Phillips remains the tournament's presenting sponsor to this day. Company employees founded the Phillips 66ers team in 1919: initially playing against other Bartlesville and Tulsa-area company teams or athletic clubs, chairman Frank Phillips would later expand the team to play a high-quality, nationwide schedule against other amateur teams while marketing Phillips 66 products. Before the foundation of the NBA after World War II, many top collegiate players would continue to play organized ball on these "industrial" teams while earning a living as corporate employees and keeping their amateur status to play in the Olympics. The most notable 66er was Bob Kurland, who won two NCAA titles at nearby Oklahoma A&M and was considered one of American basketball's first great "big men". The 7-footer passed up the opportunity to play pro for a marketing job at Phillips, winning three AAU titles and two Olympic gold medals while eventually rising to the executive level and helping to develop self-serve gas stations. Rising pro salaries and the resulting loss of national media coverage spelled doom for senior AAU ball, though, and the 66ers would close up shop after losing in the 1968 AAU quarterfinals.

Phillips 66 conspicuously sponsored PBS programming during the 1980s. It funded A.M. Weather; The Search for Solutions; and Onstage with Judith Somogi.

Spin-off
In 2012, Phillips 66 was spun off from ConocoPhillips.

Berkshire Hathaway trade
On December 30, 2013, it was announced that Berkshire Hathaway would trade more than 19 million of its 27.2 million shares in Phillips 66 to acquire a business that makes additives that help crude oil flow through pipelines.  The final number of shares was determined when the deal closed.

Spin-off of natural gas pipelines
On February 17, 2015, Phillips 66 sold two natural gas pipeline systems to its affiliate, Phillips 66 Partners for $1.01 billion in cash and stock.

Operations

In the United States, the company operates Conoco, Phillips 66 and 76 stations.  In Europe, Phillips 66 operates Jet filling stations in Austria, Denmark, Germany, Sweden and the United Kingdom.  It sold its Jet stations in Belgium, the Czech Republic, Finland, Hungary, Poland and Slovakia to its Russian affiliate, Lukoil.  It uses the Coop identity in Switzerland. The company is the fourth largest finished lubricants supplier in the United States. Phillips 66 has stations in 44 U.S. states, just behind Shell Oil Company and ExxonMobil, lacking a presence in Alaska, Delaware, Maine, New Hampshire, Vermont, and West Virginia.

It also owns 50 percent stake in Chevron Phillips Chemical Co.

Phillips 66 also owns a one-quarter share in the controversial Dakota Access Pipeline.

Refineries

* Denotes joint ventures. Crude capacity reflects that proportion.

Sources (Mar 31, 2011)

Phillips 66's Los Angeles (CA), Lake Charles (LA), San Francisco (CA), and Sweeney (TX) refineries receive and process crude oil from the Amazon River Basin of South America. In 2015, the Los Angeles refinery was processing 21,512 barrels per day of Amazonian oil.

Corporate affairs
This was a temporary headquarters location.

In July 2016, Phillips 66 completed its move to a new permanent headquarters on a  plot of land in Westchase. The new headquarters is between Westheimer Road and Briar Forest, in close proximity to the Sam Houston Tollway. Phillips 66 purchased the land from a subsidiary of Thomas Properties Group. The architect of record is HOK. The official groundbreaking was in November 2013, and the opening was completed on schedule. The 1.1 million square foot headquarters includes conference spaces, medical facilities, food service facilities, outdoor recreational space, a gymnasium with full-size basketball court, and training facilities. Irrigation of the outdoor landscaping is via a reclaimed water system. The new campus houses 2,200 workers who were spread among six different Houston locations, including the ConocoPhillips headquarters, where several hundred Phillips 66 workers had remained post spin-off.

On 4 August 2015 it was announced that the company had formed a "long-term partnership" with English non-league association football club Leamington F.C. The deal involved, amongst other things, the renaming of the club's ground from "The New Windmill Ground" to "The Phillips 66 Community Stadium."

Carbon footprint
Phillips 66 reported Total CO2e emissions (Direct + Indirect) for the twelve months ending 31 December 2020 at 30,050 Kt (-4,690 /-13.5% y-o-y).

Notes

References

External links

 

 Investor Update with Phillips 66 Business Prospects April, 2012
 Independent Business Analysis of Phillips 66

 
Automotive fuel retailers
Bartlesville, Oklahoma
Companies based in Houston
Companies based in Oklahoma
Companies listed on the New York Stock Exchange
Economy of the Midwestern United States
Economy of the Southwestern United States
Gas stations in the United States
Natural gas pipeline companies
Oil companies of the United States
U.S. Route 66
Corporate spin-offs
1917 establishments in Texas
2012 initial public offerings